Ana Maria Groza (born 1 June 1976 in Cluj-Napoca, Cluj) is a female race walker from Romania.

Achievements

References

1976 births
Living people
Romanian female racewalkers
Athletes (track and field) at the 2000 Summer Olympics
Athletes (track and field) at the 2004 Summer Olympics
Athletes (track and field) at the 2008 Summer Olympics
Olympic athletes of Romania
Sportspeople from Cluj-Napoca